Pizza al taglio or pizza al trancio (Italian for pizza by the slice — literally "by the cut") is a variety of pizza baked in large rectangular trays, and generally sold in rectangular or square slices by weight, with prices marked per kilogram or per 100 grams. This type of pizza was invented in Rome, Italy, and is common throughout Italy. Many variations and styles of pizza al taglio exist, and the dish is available in other areas of the world in addition to Italy.

Preparation

In the most traditional Italian pizza al taglio shops, such as pizzerie (singular: pizzeria) and bakeries, the pizza is often cooked in a wood-fired oven. In today's establishments, electric ovens are also often used. The rectangular pizza shape makes it easier to cut and divide the pizza to the buyer's desire, which is often distinguished by weight. The dish is often eaten as a casual, takeaway dish that is eaten outside the restaurants where it is served, such as in a piazza.

Varieties

The simplest varieties include pizza Margherita (tomato sauce, cheese, and basil), pizza bianca (olive oil, rosemary and garlic), and pizza rossa (tomato sauce only). Other typical toppings include artichokes, asparagus, eggplant, ground meat and onions, potatoes, prosciutto, salami, sausage, ground truffles, zucchini, olive oil, sun-dried tomatoes, arugula, gorgonzola, anchovies, and black olives.

Outside Italy

This style of pizza is popular casual food in Argentina, Uruguay and Malta, where for many years it has been a common way for people to grab a quick snack or meal. Pizza al taglio shops are also appearing in the United States.  In each country, the style of crusts and toppings may be adapted to suit their own cultures.

See also
 Sicilian pizza
 Neapolitan pizza
 Italian tomato pie
 Pizza by the slice

References

Pizza styles
Street food
Italian cuisine
Maltese cuisine
Italian-American cuisine
Argentine cuisine
Uruguayan cuisine
Street food in Italy